The Unstoppable Wasp is an ongoing American comic book series published by Marvel Comics featuring Nadia van Dyne (née Pym). The solo series initially debuted in January 2017 and ran for 8 issues as a part of Marvel NOW! 2.0, before relaunching in October 2018 for another run of 10 issues. The series were written by Jeremy Whitley. Art was by Elsa Charretier from the start of the publication until the second run, which Gurihiru took over as artist for. In May 2020, Disney Books published a young adult novel continuing the series written by Sam Maggs, titled The Unstoppable Wasp: Built On Hope. Critics have praised the series for its comedy as well as its portrayal of relationships and bipolar disorder.

Publication history
Starting in July 2016, the Civil War II crossover storyline affected a number of Marvel comics and characters, introducing the character of Nadia Pym / The Wasp. Marvel announced in late 2016 that, after Civil War was complete, they would relaunch their entire line as part of a Marvel NOW! 2.0 rebranding, including The Unstoppable Wasp, with the series following Nadia after acquiring U.S. citizenship, as she starts the program G.I.R.L. (Genius In action Research Labs) to look for women with genius intellects upon realizing that S.H.I.E.L.D.'s index of the world's most intelligent people doesn't list any women above 27th place, adopting the new surname "Van Dyne" after Janet van Dyne.

Plot

Volume 1

Volume 2

Reception
Issue #1 was published on January 5, 2017, to positive reviews. The Unstoppable Wasp was praised for its comedy, and the character of Nadia Pym (later van Dyne) was seen as empowering for being likable, smart, and having an infectious charm unlike that of typical superheroes. Comics Alliance praised the series' "structure, pacing and character interactions", regarded its "Unstoppable" title as "the perfect adjective for the series, because Nadia represents a kind of determination and perseverance that’s both admirable and inspiring." CBR expressed interest in the series being adapted to the Marvel Cinematic Universe, while Comics Beat lauded the series' "enticing" nature and "Jeremy Whitley’s commitment to Nadia Pym’s unwavering & infectious optimism against the worst odds [with] Elsa Charretier’s incredible layouts and spreads add[ing] so much substance to the vibrant personality of this comic". The series' depiction of bipolar disorder was also praised.

Collected editions
The series has been collected into trade paperbacks:

Novels
Nadia van Dyne has also been featured in one middle grade novel.

References

External links
The Unstoppable Wasp (2017) at Marvel Entertainment
The Unstoppable Wasp (2018–2019) at Marvel Entertainment
Interview with Jeremy Whitley, Geek Dad

Bipolar disorder in fiction
Comics about women
Novels about bipolar disorder
Original English-language manga